Hitchcockella baronii is a species of bamboo, the only known species of the genus Hitchcockella. It is found in Madagascar and was first described by Aimée Antoinette Camus in 1925.

References

Bambusoideae
Endemic flora of Madagascar
Bambusoideae genera
Monotypic Poaceae genera
Taxa named by Aimée Antoinette Camus